Gugney-aux-Aulx is a commune in the Vosges department in Grand Est in northeastern France. As of 2011, the commune has a population of 156.

See also
Communes of the Vosges department

References

External links

Official site

Communes of Vosges (department)